Tahuantinsuyoa is a small genus of cichlids endemic to Peru where they are found in the Amazon Basin.

Species
There are currently two recognized species in this genus:
 Tahuantinsuyoa chipi S. O. Kullander,  1991
 Tahuantinsuyoa macantzatza S. O. Kullander, 1986

References

Cichlasomatini
Cichlid genera
Taxa named by Sven O. Kullander